José Antonio Galán (c. 1749 in Charalá, Santander (New Kingdom of Granada) – February 2, 1782 in Santafé de Bogotá (Id.)) was a Neogranadine historical figure of the 18th century. He was the leader of the Comuneros insurrection in 1781, who was then sentenced and executed by the Spanish.

See also
Insurrection of the Comuneros (Spanish Wiki)
José Antonio Galán (Spanish Wiki)
Manuela Beltrán (Spanish Wiki)

Bibliography
AGUILERA Peña, Mario. "Los comuneros: guerra social y lucha anticolonial". Bogotá, Universidad Nacional de Colombia, 1985.
ARCINIEGAS, Germán. "20.000 Comuneros hacia Santa Fe". Bogotá, Pluma, 1981.
CASTELLANOS TAPIAS, Luis. "El Alzamiento". Bogotá, Ediciones Edicrón-Editorial Guadalupe, 1962. A novel set around the Comunero movement (1781) of the Virreinato de Nueva Granada.
FRIEDE, Juan. "Rebelión comunera de 1781. Documentos". Bogotá, Colcultura, 1981.
GUTIERREZ, José Fulgencio. "Galán y los Comuneros". Bucaramanga, Imprenta Departamental, 1939.
PHELAN, John Leddy. "El pueblo y el rey. La revolución comunera en Colombia, 1781". Bogotá, Carlos Valencia, 1980

1749 births
1782 deaths
History of Colombia
18th-century Colombian people